Mathias Schipper (born 23 September 1957) is a retired German footballer, who played as a defender for Schalke 04 and Alemannia Aachen. From 1976 until 1988, he completed 189 matches in the Bundesliga (all for Schalke) and made 139 appearances in the 2. Bundesliga (Schalke 32, Alemannia 107). Since 2017, he is a member of the electoral committee of Schalke, which decides on the admission of candidates for the election of the Supervisory Board.

References

External links 
 

1957 births
Living people
German footballers
Association football defenders
Bundesliga players
2. Bundesliga players
FC Schalke 04 players
Alemannia Aachen players
People from Castrop-Rauxel
Sportspeople from Münster (region)
Footballers from North Rhine-Westphalia